The Port Talbot Deanery is a Roman Catholic deanery in the Diocese of Menevia that covers several churches in Neath Port Talbot and the surrounding area.

The dean is centred at St Joseph Church in Port Talbot.

Churches
 St Therese of Lisieux, Port Talbot
 St Joseph, Port Talbot
 St Philip Evans, Cwmafan - served from St Joseph, Port Talbot
 St Joseph, Cymmer
 Our Lady of Margam, Port Talbot
 St Joseph, Neath
 St John Kemble, Glynneath - served from St Joseph, Neath
 Our Lady of the Assumption, Neath

Gallery

References

External links
 Diocese of Menevia site
 St Joseph Parish Port Talbot site
 St Joseph Parish Neath site

Roman Catholic Deaneries in the Diocese of Menevia